Uladzimir Shakaw (born 28 August 1984) is a Belarusian professional footballer.

External links

1984 births
Living people
Belarusian footballers
Association football forwards
FC Naftan Novopolotsk players
FC Savit Mogilev players
FC Torpedo-BelAZ Zhodino players
FC Polotsk players
FC Vitebsk players
FC Slonim-2017 players
FC SKVICH Minsk players
FC Dnepr Mogilev players
FC Gorodeya players
FC Slutsk players
People from Polotsk
Sportspeople from Vitebsk Region